Chamomile (American English) or camomile (British English; see spelling differences) (  or ) is the common name for several  plants of the family Asteraceae. Two of the species, Matricaria chamomilla and Chamaemelum nobile, are commonly used to make herbal infusions for beverages. There is insufficient scientific evidence that consuming chamomile in foods or beverages has any beneficial effects on health.

Etymology 
First used in the 13th century, the spelling chamomile corresponds to the Latin  and the Greek . The spelling camomile is a British derivation from the French.

Species 

Some commonly used species include:
 Matricaria chamomilla – often called "German chamomile" or "Water of Youth"
 Chamaemelum nobile – Roman, English, or garden chamomile; also frequently used (C. nobile Treneague is normally used to create a chamomile lawn)

A number of other species' common names include the word chamomile. This does not mean they are used in the same manner as the species used in the herbal tea known as "chamomile". Plants including the common name chamomile, of the family Asteraceae, are:
 Anthemis arvensis – corn, scentless or field chamomile
 Anthemis cotula – stinking chamomile
 Cladanthus mixtus – Moroccan chamomile
 Chamaemelum nobile – Roman chamomile
 Cota tinctoria – dyer's, golden, oxeye, or yellow chamomile
 Eriocephalus punctulatus – Cape chamomile
 Matricaria discoidea – wild chamomile or pineapple weed
 Tripleurospermum inodorum – wild, scentless or false chamomile

Uses 
Chamomile may be used as a flavoring agent in foods and beverages, mouthwash, soaps, or cosmetics. It is used to "upholster" chamomile seats, raised beds which are about half a meter tall, and designed to be sat upon. Chamomile lawns are also used in sunny areas with light traffic.

Tea 
Chamomile tea is a herbal infusion made from dried flowers and hot water, and may improve sleep quality. Two types of chamomile used are German chamomile (Matricaria recutita) and Roman chamomile (Chamaemelum nobile).

Use in beer and ale 
Chamomile has historically been used in making beer and ale. Unlike for tea, in which only the flowers are used, the whole plant has been used to make beers and ales, adding a bitter flavor component favored by craft breweries and homebrewers.

Research 
The main constituents of chamomile flowers are polyphenol compounds, including apigenin, quercetin, patuletin, and luteolin. Chamomile is under preliminary research for its potential anti-anxiety properties. There is no high-quality clinical evidence that it is useful for treating insomnia or any disease.

Drug interactions 
The use of chamomile has the potential to cause adverse interactions with numerous herbal products and prescription drugs and may worsen pollen allergies. People who are allergic to ragweed (also in the daisy family) may be allergic to chamomile due to cross-reactivity.

Apigenin, a phytochemical in chamomile, may interact with anticoagulant agents and nonsteroidal anti-inflammatory drugs, while other phytochemicals may adversely interact with sleep-enhancing herbal products and vitamins.

Chamomile is not recommended to be taken with aspirin or  NSAIDs (non-steroidal anti-inflammatory drugs), as it may cause drug–herb interaction. Chamomile consists of several ingredients including coumarin, glycoside, herniarin, flavonoid, farnesol, nerolidol and germacranolide. Despite the presence of coumarin, as chamomile's effect on the coagulation system has not yet been studied, it is unknown whether a clinically significant drug–herb interaction exists with antiplatelet/anticoagulant drugs. However, until more information is available, it is not recommended to use these substances concurrently.

Chamomile should not be used by people with past or present cancers of the breast, ovary, or uterus; endometriosis; or uterine fibroids.

Pregnancy and breastfeeding 
Because chamomile has been known to cause uterine contractions that can invoke miscarriage, pregnant women are advised to not consume Roman chamomile (Chamaemelum nobile). Although oral consumption of chamomile is generally recognized as safe in the United States, there is insufficient clinical evidence about its potential for affecting nursing infants.

Agriculture 
The chamomile plant is known to be susceptible to many fungi, insects, and viruses. Fungi such as Albugo tragopogonis (white rust), Cylindrosporium matricariae, Erysiphe cichoracearum (powdery mildew), and Sphaerotheca macularis (powdery mildew) are known pathogens of the chamomile plant. Aphids have been observed feeding on chamomile plants and the moth Autographa chryson causes defoliation.

Historical descriptions 
The 11th century part of Old English Illustrated Herbal has an illustrated entry. Nicholas Culpeper's 17th century The Complete Herbal has an illustration and several entries on chamomel.

In culture 
 In The Tale of Peter Rabbit by Beatrix Potter (1902), Peter is given chamomile tea after being chased by Mr. McGregor.
 Mary Wesley's 1984 novel The Camomile Lawn features a house in Cornwall with a lawn planted with chamomile rather than grass.
 In the No Doubt song "Hey Baby", chamomile is featured in the line "I'm just sippin' on chamomile", sung by Gwen Stefani.
 Chamomile is the national flower of Russia.

References

External links 

 PLANTS Profile: Anthemis tinctoria L. (golden chamomile), USDA
 

Plant common names
Medicinal plants
Flower tea
Flora of Mexico